John and Cynthia Garwood Farmstead is a historic home and farm located in Center Township, LaPorte County, Indiana.  The house was built about 1866, and is a tall -story, three-bay, Italian Villa style brick dwelling.  It has a gabled-ell form with a center tower.  Also on the property are the contributing gambrel-roofed barn (c. 1930), milk house (c. 1930), and silo (c. 1930).

It was listed on the National Register of Historic Places in 2012.

References

Farms on the National Register of Historic Places in Indiana
Italianate architecture in Indiana
Houses completed in 1866
Houses in LaPorte County, Indiana
National Register of Historic Places in LaPorte County, Indiana